The Battle of St Albans may refer to one of the two battles  fought in or near the city of St Albans during the English Wars of the Roses:
 The First Battle of St Albans was the first battle of the war and was fought on 22 May 1455. 
 The Second Battle of St Albans was fought on 22 February 1461.

See also
St. Albans Raid, battle of the American Civil War.